UWA-101 (also known as α-cyclopropyl-MDMA) is a phenethylamine derivative invented by Dr Matthew Piggott at the University of Western Australia, and researched as a potential treatment for Parkinson's disease. Its chemical structure is very similar to that of the illegal drug MDMA, the only difference being the replacement of the α-methyl group with an α-cyclopropyl group. MDMA has been found in animal studies and reported in unauthorised human self-experiments to be effective in the short-term relief of side-effects of Parkinson's disease therapy, most notably levodopa-induced dyskinesia. However the illegal status of MDMA and concerns about its potential for recreational use, neurotoxicity and potentially dangerous side effects mean that it is unlikely to be investigated for medical use in this application, and so alternative analogues were investigated.

Replacing the α-methyl with a cyclopropyl dramatically reduces affinity for the noradrenaline transporter and 5-HT2A receptor, while retaining high serotonin transporter affinity and markedly increasing affinity for the dopamine transporter (and as such, it is one of the few selective SDRIs or serotonin-dopamine reuptake inhibitors). This change causes UWA-101 to lack cytotoxicity and MDMA-like behavioral effects in animals, while retaining similar or slightly improved antidyskinetic effectiveness when compared to MDMA. This research was a continuation of earlier work from the same team which showed that replacing the α-methyl group of MDMA with larger aromatic ring systems produced compounds which lacked psychoactivity and neurotoxicity, but had potent anti-cancer effects against Burkitt's lymphoma cells in vitro.

UWA-121 is the (R)-enantiomer of UWA-101 and the (S)-enantiomer is UWA-122. Both are active monoamine reuptake inhibitors.

Another relative is UWA-104 ("α-isopropyl-MDMA"), which is also active.

See also 
 MBDB
 Methyl-K (UWA-091)
 Isohexylone
 UWA-001
 Zylofuramine
 RTI-83 - another drug which selectively increases dopamine and serotonin levels without affecting noradrenaline

References

External links 
 Do neurologists dance? A personal experience of Parkinson's disease & MDMA, Tim Lawrence, 2003

Phenethylamines
Serotonin–dopamine reuptake inhibitors